Prof Eric Openshaw Taylor FRSE PRSSA FIEE (c.1900–1987) was a 20th century British electrical engineer and scientific author. He was an early advocate of the use of nuclear power to create electricity.

Life
He studied Electrical Engineering at the University of London graduating BSc.

He became Professor of Electrical engineering at Heriot-Watt University in Edinburgh.

In 1944 he was elected a Fellow of the Royal Society of Edinburgh. His proposers were Maurice Say, James Cameron Smail, Nicholas Lightfoot and James Sandilands.

In 1956 he succeeded Robert Waldron Plenderleith as President of the Royal Scottish Society of Arts.

He died at Furze Hill in southern England on 16 October 1987.

Publications

Power Systems Economics
Utilisation of Electric Energy
Performance and Design of A/C Commutator Motors
Watt, Faraday and Parsons
Electromechanical Energy Conversion
Direct Current Machines (with Maurice George Say)
Nuclear Reactors for Power Generation
Electric Power Distribution
Nuclear Power Plant

References

1987 deaths
British electrical engineers
Fellows of the Royal Society of Edinburgh